Starý Smokovec is a part of the town of Vysoké Tatry in northern Slovakia in the Tatras. Its name is pronounced approximately "Star-EE Smoke-oh-vets", meaning "Old Smokovec".

Starý Smokovec is a popular resort for skiing and hiking. It also forms the junction of the Tatra Electric Railway train line, connecting Poprad, Tatranská Lomnica and Štrbské Pleso.

Amongst the more important buildings in the district are the sanatorium and the Grand Hotel (established in 1904). It is connected by the Starý Smokovec–Hrebienok funicular to the small ski resort of Hrebienok at 1285 m.

Rail transport 
Lines: ,

Gallery

Further reading

https://web.archive.org/web/20060930145951/http://www.tanap.sk/starysmokovec.html
http://www.vysoketatry.com/obce/ssmokovec/en.html
http://www.vysoketatry.com/mapy/ssmokovecd/ssmokovecd.html - map of the town.
https://web.archive.org/web/20061230105142/http://www.vysoketatry.org/skiing/hrebienok.html - skiing information.

Ski areas and resorts in Slovakia
Spiš